Taghzout may refer to:

 Taghzout, Bouïra, Algeria
 Taghzout, El Oued, Algeria
 Taghzout, Morocco